Workin' on a Groovy Thing is an album by Brazilian guitarist Bola Sete, released in 1970 through Paramount Records. It contains "Bettina", which has been sampled by popular artists such as Lovage, Destiny's Child and A Tribe Called Quest.

Track listing

Personnel 

Musicians
José Marino – bass guitar
Frank Obligacion – congas
Bola Sete – acoustic guitar
Claudio Slon – drums

Production and additional personnel
Hank Cicalo – engineering
Tom Mack – production
Rusty Miller – photography
Milt Rogers – string arrangement on "Don't Leave Me", "Bettina" and "Tuei"
Christopher Whorf – design

Release history

References 

1970 albums
Bola Sete albums
Paramount Records (1969) albums